Christ Presented to the People, also known as Ostentatio Christi or Ecce Homo, is a drypoint print by Rembrandt van Rijn which exists in eight states, all c.1655. It has been described by Christie's as "at the summit of the western printmaking tradition".

Description
The print depicts an episode from the Passion of Jesus in which Pontius Pilate presents Jesus to the people, saying "ecce homo" ("behold the man"), offering to free either Jesus or the notorious criminal Barabbas, and asks the crowd to choose between them.  The scene echoes contemporary judicial practice in the Netherlands, in which magistrates bearing a staff of office would present a condemned criminal to the public from a raised balcony or platform.  The building in the background resembles the new Town Hall in Amsterdam by Jacob van Campen, completed in 1655 and now the Royal Palace of Amsterdam.

The main figures are on a platform above the crowd, in front of a dark archway.  Accompanied by armed guards, Pilate stands with a long staff, wearing an oriental turban and long gown, gesturing to the two prisoners who stand bound to the right.  To the left is a scribe and youth with an ewer of water, ready for Pilate to wash his hands.  Niches in the building behind them have allegorical sculptures of Justice and Fortitude.  The building continues with windows and balconies on either side above arched doorways, one window perhaps occupied by Pilate's wife.  Rembrandt has included a motley collection of characters in the crowd, with some Jewish elders observing to the right.

Rembrandt was inspired by Lucas van Leyden's 1510 etching of the same scene, of which he owned a copy.  Rembrandt continued producing prints until the 1660s, but this was the last depicting the Passion.

States
Rembrandt's prints were made from a drypoint engraving on copper plate, and eight states are known.

Save for the architecture to the top right, the first state was nearly complete.  Only eight versions of the first state are known, printed on expensively imported yellowish Japanese paper.  Seven are in public collections, at Kupferstichkabinett Berlin of the Staatliche Museen zu Berlin, the British Museum in London, the Morgan Library and Museum in New York, the Ashmolean Museum in Oxford, two in Paris at the Dutuit collection at the Musée du Petit Palais and the collection of Edmond de Rothschild at the Musée du Louvre, and at the Graphische Sammlung Albertina in Vienna.  The last remaining impression of the first state in private hands was sold at Christie's in July 2018 from the collection of the late Samuel Josefowitz for £2.2 million, setting a record for an Old Master print (passing the £410,000 paid for a print of Rembrandt's The Three Crosses in 2006).  No impressions of the second to fourth states are held privately.

Only minor changes were made in the next two states.  The second state adds cross-hatched shading to the doorway to the left, and the third state adds similar shading to the right leg of the gesturing man on the left of the platform.  The missing architecture to the top right is completed in the fourth state, with a balustrade added above the windows; at the same time, an inch (25 mm) was removed from the top of the print in this state, eliminating the architrave above the central building, allowing Rembrandt to print the whole composition on just a single sheet of paper: the first three impressions needed a thin strip of paper to be added along the top.  

By the fifth state, several dozen impressions have been made and the soft copper plate was showing signs of wear, and some shading is added to the windows to the right.  The wear was countered in the sixth state by significant reworking in some areas, including removing the crowd of figures in front of the central platform: only two impressions are known of this version.  By the seventh state, two arches have been added to the front wall of the platform.  Rembrandt signed and dated the seventh version, and then added more changes to the eighth and last version.

It is unclear why Rembrandt decided to print intermediate versions of the print, and indeed why they were printed on expensive imported paper.  Usual practice was to take impression at each stage while the engraving developed on cheap paper which could be discarded, and then make several impressions of the completed version for sale.  Only the last two states are signed and dated above the archway to the right of the central platform ("Rembrandt f. 1655"), suggesting he may have regarded the others as only intermediate stages or artist's proofs.  However, Rembrandt may have been motivated by a commercial desire to sell rare limited editions to collectors.  Arnold Houbraken noted in 1718 that Rembrandt would make small changes so he could sell prints as new designs.

Gallery

References
  Christie's Old Masters – London, 9 July 2018, Rehs Galleries, Inc
  Rembrandt, "Christ presented to the people" ('Ecce Homo'), Christie's, 5 July 2018
 Christie's auction catalogue, 5 July 2018
 The culmination of an obsession: Rembrandt's Ecce Homo, Christie's, 6 July 2018
 Record for a Rembrandt print at Christie's Old Master sale, Antiques Trade Gazette, 6 July 2018
 Rembrandt in detail, National Gallery, London

 Rijksmuseum: Christ Presented to the People (Ecce Homo), state iii • state viii

 British Museum: state i • state iii • state iii • state iv • state iv • state vi

 Metropolitan Museum of Art: state ii • state iv • state viii

 Christ presented to the people: oblong plate, state v, Art Gallery of New South Wales
 Christ Presented to the People, Rembrandt, 1655, Google Arts & Culture, from the Museum Boijmans Van Beuningen
 Christ Presented to the People, Museum Boijmans Van Beuningen

 Christ Presented to the People (Ecce Homo), Art Fund, from the Scottish National Gallery 
 Ecce Homo: Christ Presented to the People, National Galleries Scotland, state v

 Morgan Library and Museum
 state i • CORSAIR Online Collection Catalog 
 state viii • CORSAIR Online Collection Catalog

Prints of the Rijksmuseum Amsterdam
1655 works
Prints by Rembrandt
Prints depicting the Passion of Jesus